Çeksan Shipyard (Turkish: Çeksan Tersanesi) is a Turkish shipyard established in Istanbul in 1960.

See also 

 List of shipbuilders and shipyards

References

External links 

 Ceksan Shipyard

Turkish companies established in 1960
Shipyards of Turkey
Shipbuilding companies of Turkey
Golden Horn